Akai Aaksho is a 2006 Bengali film directed by Babu Ray and produced by Bengal Film 2004. The film features actors Prosenjit Chatterjee and Rachana Banerjee in the lead roles. Music of the film has been composed by Bappi Lahiri.

Cast
 Prosenjit Chatterjee as Ratan (Auto driver)
 Rachna Banerjee as Jhilik Roy (Pradip's daughter)
 Sandhya Roy as Ratan's mother
 Dipankar Dey as Pradip Roy (A corrupt MLA)
 Mrinal Mukherjee as Shiraj Chacha (Garage owner)
 Pushpita Mukherjee as Rumu (Ratan's sister)
 Rajesh Sharma as Noche Choudhury (Local goon)
 Bharat Kaul as Tapan (Ratan's brother)
 Raja Chattopadhyay as Swapan (Ratan's brother)
 Tathoi Deb
 Sudip Mukherjee as OC, a henchman of Pradip Roy
 Moushumi Saha as a teacher and caretaker of an old orphanage home.

References

2006 films
Bengali-language Indian films
Films scored by Bappi Lahiri
2000s Bengali-language films